Calogero Lorenzo "Chazz" Palminteri (born May 15, 1952) is an American actor. He is best known for his Academy Award–nominated performance in Bullets Over Broadway, the 1993 film A Bronx Tale, based on his play of the same name, and his recurring role as Shorty in Modern Family.

Early life 
Calogero Lorenzo Palminteri was born on May 15, 1952, in the Bronx borough of New York City, the son of Rose, a homemaker, and Lorenzo Palminteri, a bus driver. He was raised in the Belmont neighborhood of the Bronx. Palminteri is of Sicilian origin; his grandparents, Calogero Palminteri and Rosa Bonfante, married in 1908, and immigrated to the United States in 1910 from Menfi in the province of Agrigento, Sicily. At the age of nine, Palminteri witnessed the murder of a mobster in front of his apartment building; the police questioned him, but he maintained that he did not see the incident.

He struggled to become an actor, splitting his time between acting in off-Broadway plays and moonlighting as a bouncer, alongside Dolph Lundgren.

Career

Theater 
Palminteri starred on Broadway in A Bronx Tale, the autobiographical one-man show based on his childhood that he first performed at Theatre West in Los Angeles in 1989. Palminteri states that he began writing the play after being fired from a club when, as a doorman, he refused entry to super agent Swifty Lazar. The Broadway production, directed by Jerry Zaks and with music by John Gromada, began previews October 4, 1988, at the Walter Kerr Theatre and opened on October 25, running for 18 weeks. Palminteri plays 18 roles in A Bronx Tale, which depicts a rough childhood on the streets of the Bronx. The play ran for two months at Playhouse 91 in 1989.

Palminteri starred opposite Kenny D'Aquila in D'Aquila's play, Unorganized Crime. Palminteri always appreciated the shot that Robert De Niro gave him, so he in turn agreed to star in D'Aquila's mafia-themed drama.

Palminteri performed in the Broadway musical version of A Bronx Tale in 2018.

Film career 
Robert De Niro saw Palminteri's Broadway show of A Bronx Tale in 1990, and the two partnered together to adapt the play into a film. Palminteri created the screenplay and starred as Sonny, the gangster Calogero meets, while De Niro directed the film, making his directorial debut, also co-starring as Lorenzo, Calogero's father. The film was a commercial and critical success. In 1994, Chazz Palminteri played mob henchman Cheech in the black comedy film Bullets Over Broadway, for which he was nominated for the Academy Award for Best Supporting Actor.

Palminteri also had performances in films such as The Usual Suspects, The Perez Family, Jade, and Diabolique, as well as comedic roles in films such as Oscar, Analyze This, and Down to Earth.

During its run, he appeared in many advertisements for Vanilla Coke, in which he portrayed a mob boss who would threaten celebrities if they did not praise the taste of the product in question, and then let them walk away with the Vanilla Coke to "reward their curiosity", touching on its slogan at the time. Palminteri has voiced characters in various animated films, the most notable being Smokey in Stuart Little and Woolworth in Hoodwinked.

He made his directorial debut with an episode of Oz, then the television film Women vs. Men and the 2004 feature film Noel.

Palminteri's recent acting efforts include A Guide to Recognizing Your Saints, Running Scared, and Arthur and the Minimoys.

In 2004, he received the "Indie Hero Award" from the Method Fest Independent Film Festival for his artistic achievements in film.

Television 
On January 20, 2010, Palminteri guested on Modern Family and played the same character on the November 2, 2011, episode. Palminteri has reprised the role twice more in season 5. In June 2010, Palminteri began guest-starring on the TNT crime drama Rizzoli & Isles as Frank Rizzoli, Sr. He guest starred twice on the CBS drama Blue Bloods as Angelo Gallo, a mob lawyer and childhood friend of main character Frank Reagan.

Palminteri portrayed deceased mobster Paul Castellano in the 2001 TV film Boss of Bosses.

Other work 
In 2011, Palminteri opened a restaurant, Chazz: A Bronx Original, in Baltimore's Little Italy neighborhood; their main foods are coal-fired pizza and Italian food.  However, the restaurant closed in 2015. Palminteri opened an Italian restaurant, Chazz Palminteri Ristorante Italiano, in New York City on Second Avenue.  Also, Palminteri did the voice acting for the Call of Duty: Black Ops II character Sal De Luca in the zombies map Mob of the Dead, and his likeness was used for the character as well.

On February 8, 2021, amidst the COVID-19 pandemic, a video posted to YouTube featuring Mr. Palminteri delivering a public service announcement as a prequel to the debut of the Chazz Palminteri Show, an hour-long live-streamed weekly infotainment installation hosted by the veteran actor and playwright (A Bronx Tale, The Usual Suspects). True to word, on February 15, 2021, the first episode of Chazz Palminteri Show, titled "It's All You" kicked off the series. Live-streamed and posted each Monday at 11 o'clock Eastern Standard Time on Palminteri's YouTube channel, Chazz Palminteri Show is an hour-long show delivered in classic talk show format that conveys content centrally grounded in moral ethics, essential life lessons and traditional "old school" loving family values. Producers of Chazz Palminteri Show are Dante Lorenzo Palminteri and podcaster / producer Michael Lavin. Guests features who have been featured on the show include actor William Baldwin, Episode 3 and, Kathrine Narducci, Episode 86 and Phil Stutz (co-author, "The Tools"), Episode 53.

Personal life 

Palminteri lives in Westchester County, New York in the town of Bedford. He describes himself as a "very spiritual", devout Roman Catholic. He married Gianna Ranaudo in 1992, and together they have two children.

Filmography

Film

Television

Video games

Theatre work

Broadway 
 2007 – A Bronx Tale – performer
 2013 – Human – performer and writer
 2016 – A Bronx Tale – writer and performer

Off-Broadway 
 1989 – A Bronx Tale – writer and performer
 2002 – The Resistible Rise of Arturo Ui – Ernesto Roma

References

External links 

 
 A Bronx Tale on Broadway | The Official Website
 AskChazz.com
 

1952 births
American male film actors
American male stage actors
American male television actors
American male voice actors
People of Sicilian descent
Belmont, Bronx
Catholics from New York (state)
Film directors from New York City
Independent Spirit Award for Best Supporting Male winners
Living people
Male actors from New York City
People from the Bronx
Sundance Film Festival award winners
American people of Italian descent